Pants on Fire may refer to:

Film and television
 Pants on Fire (film), a 2014 American television film
 Pants on Fire, a 2019 British television programme presented by Emma Willis

Episodes
 "Pants on Fire" (A.N.T. Farm), 2013
 "Pants on Fire" (Dream On), 1991
 "Pants on Fire" (Everybody Loves Raymond), 1999
 "Pants on Fire" (The Good Wife), 2012
 "Pants on Fire" (Little Mosque on the Prairie), 2010
 "Pants on Fire" (Mary-Kate and Ashley in Action!), 2002

Literature
 Pants on Fire (novel), a 2007 novel by Meg Cabot
 Pants on Fire, a 2010 novel by Simon Cheshire
 Pants on Fire, a 1995 play by Ken Garnhum

Songs
 "Pants on Fire", a 2001 song by Buck 65 from  Man Overboard
 "Pants on Fire", a 2008 song by Something with Numbers from Engineering the Soul
 "Pants on Fire (Liar, Liar)", a 1991 song by Kix from Hot Wire

Other uses
 Pants On Fire (horse) (foaled 2008), an American Thoroughbred racehorse
 Pants on Fire, a truthfulness rating used by PolitiFact.com

See also
 Liar Liar (disambiguation)
 Pant on Fire, a 2011 comedy show by Sorabh Pant
 Skipping-rope rhyme
 George Santos